DaBryan Blanton (born July 3, 1984) is an American sprint athlete. He attended the University of Oklahoma, where he was a three-time Big 12 champion in the 100 metres, until 2005, when he decided to sign a professional contract with Nike.

In his freshman season at Oklahoma, while still a junior athlete by IAAF standards, Blanton ran a 10.07 in the 100 metres, which at the time tied Stanley Floyd's American Junior Record.

A native of Forney, Texas, Blanton also played football in high school, and was ranked the No. 47 prospect in the nation by Rivals.com.

References

External links

DyeStat profile for DaBryan Blanton
USATF profile for DaBryan Blanton 
Oklahoma Sooners bio

1984 births
Living people
People from Forney, Texas
American male sprinters
Oklahoma Sooners men's track and field athletes
USA Indoor Track and Field Championships winners